Norwest railway station is an underground rapid transit station built by the Metro Trains Sydney consortium at Brookhollow Avenue, Norwest, in Sydney, New South Wales, Australia. The station was built as part of Transport for NSW's Sydney Metro Northwest project, to serve future train services to Rouse Hill and Chatswood. The station is planned to eventually serve trains to the Sydney central business district and Bankstown as part of the government's 20-year Sydney's Rail Future strategy. Norwest station takes its name from the 172-hectare Norwest Business Park, in which it is located.

History

The NSW Government announced a future railway line to Castle Hill as part of its Action for Public Transport strategy in 1998. A more specific but longer-term plan presented by Co-ordinator General of Rail Ron Christie three years later included a 'Mungerie Park Line', with a station at Norwest Business Park. In the years that followed, Norwest Station formed part of successive north-western rail proposals, including the Metropolitan Rail Expansion Plan in 2005 and a short-lived metro proposal in 2008.

Following a change of government, work on the North West Rail Link commenced in 2013. As part of the approved proposal, an additional station, Bella Vista, was added within the business park. The new station opened in 26 May 2019. The station is operated by Metro Trains Sydney, which was also responsible for the design of the station as part of its Operations, Trains and Systems contract with Transport for NSW.

Services

Norwest has two platforms. It is served by Metro North West Line services. Norwest station is served by a number of bus routes operated by Busways and Hillsbus.

References

External links
 Norwest Station description at Sydney Metro Northwest project website
 Northwest Rapid Transit corporate website
 Norwest Station details Transport for New South Wales  (Archived 16 June 2019)

Easy Access railway stations in Sydney
Railway stations in Australia opened in 2019
Sydney Metro stations
The Hills Shire